The 157th Pennsylvania House of Representatives District is located in Chester County and includes the following areas:

 Chester County
 Easttown Township
 Schuylkill Township 
 Tredyffrin Township 
 Williston Township

Representatives

Recent election results

References 

Government of Chester County, Pennsylvania
Government of Montgomery County, Pennsylvania
157